La'Mule (formerly stylized as La:Mule) was a Japanese visual kei rock band formed in 1996. The band became known for its distinctive visual style, featuring blood and bandages.

History

La'Mule were formed in 1996 in Shikoku, Japan. Allegedly the band was slow to release material as they preferred to participate in events with fans rather than spend time in the recording studio. Their first CD, Toki no Souretsu was released in April 1998.

In September 1998, both guitarists (Yuki and Fumi) left the band, and were replaced by Sin and Nao. Their first Japan-wide tour took place in November 1999.

In 2001, they formed Slit, their own record label, for the release of the album 'Climax'. In 2003, La'Mule announced an indefinite hiatus, however, they did re-form in 2010 in order to play a number of live shows. In 2012, the band formally disbanded. Their last concert took place on 6 April 2012.

Members
Kon (紺) - Vocals
Sin - Lead Guitar
Nao - Rhythm Guitar
Isuke - Bass
You-ya - Drums

Past members
Fumi - Guitar, until 1998
Yuki - Guitar, until 1998

Discography
Demo tapes
 Lepra (1st press) (March, 1996)
 Black Tape (September 7, 1996)
 Lepra (2nd press) (November, 1996)
 Mis-take of Out-take (April, 1997)
 Joukei no Miyako (May, 1997)
 Mind Control/Usagi no Tsumi (January 6, 1998)
 Sola (July 18, 2001)

Albums
 Inspire (December 2, 1998)
 Fuyuutsuki ~Yuigadai Kikeikyouten~ (January 11, 1999)
 Climax (February 22, 2001)
 Best (September 10, 2002)
 Eyes Bloodshed (April 5, 2013)

Mini Albums
 Toki no Souretsu (April 4, 1998)

Singles
 Curse (March 25, 1999)
 Kekkai -Glass Shinkei to Jiga Kyoukai- (July 28, 1999)
 Nigatsu Itsuka no Namida (March, 2000)
 Knife (June 6, 2000)
 Sweet Enemy (May 21, 2001)
 Memory of Flow (May 25, 2001)
 Ichinichi no Kodoku Hyakunen no Kodoku (July 20, 2001)
 Ran (December 24, 2001)
 Gimmick (February 2, 2002)
 Fit to Naked the Heavens Fall (May 29, 2002)
 Psycho Dive (November 11, 2002)
 Berlin (December 12, 2002)

Videos
 Inspire (February 12, 1999)
 Kekkai -Glass Shinkei to Jiga Kyoukai- (July 28, 1999)
 Curse (July 28, 1999)
 Knife (June 6, 2000)
 Sweet Enemy (May 21, 2001)
 Everlasting (September 23, 2002)

References 

Visual kei musical groups
Japanese alternative metal musical groups
Japanese gothic metal musical groups
Musical groups from Tokyo
Musical groups established in 1996
1996 establishments in Japan